The Independence Palace (Täuelsızdık Saraiy), also known as the Palace of Independence, is a palace in Astana, Kazakhstan. It is used for official state functions, including forums, meetings and conventions. On December 15, 2008 the palace was officially opened to the public. Construction continued until half a year later, although. 

The outside of the palace is made out of blue glass with a lattice of white pipes. The building is shaped into a trapezoid. The halls of the palace include: a gallery of applied art, the Museum of City History of Astana, and a four-dimensional cinema.

Events

Summits 

The Congress Hall has witnessed many historic events. In 2010, a OSCE Summit was held in the Palace of Independence. The meeting of the Supreme Eurasian Economic Council, as well as anniversary summits of SCO and OIC, have taken place in the palace. The most significant event in the history of the palace was a 2019 meeting of speakers of the parliaments of the Eurasian countries.

Domestic events 

The inauguration ceremony of President Nursultan Nazarbayev (2011 and 2015) and President Kassym-Jomart Tokayev (2019 and 2022) took place at the palace. Nur Otan party congresses are held annually.

References 

Buildings and structures in Astana
Government buildings completed in 2008